Sultanahmet Jail, a former prison in Istanbul, Turkey, is now the luxury Four Seasons Hotel at Sultanahmet. It is located in Sultanahmet neighborhood of Fatih district on the historical peninsula.

History 
Built in 1918/1919, it was the first jailhouse in the capital of the Ottoman Empire, constructed in a contemporary concept considering the regulation of the daily life and relationship with the outside of inmates, who were awaiting trial or serving brief sentences. The building was designed in Turkish neoclassical style in the beginning of the period called "First National Architecture". It was built next to the courthouse building, which was constructed in 1845 initially as university. An inscription in Ottoman language upon the main gate of the building states the name of the facility as the "Dersaadet Murder Jail". It is a four-story building with guard towers enclosing a courtyard.

In the jailhouse, juveniles and women were also detained. Following the establishment of the Sağmalcılar prison, the inmates were transferred to the new site and the jail was abandoned on January 25, 1969. Later during the military rule, the building continued to be used as a military jailhouse.

Notable inmates 
Sultanahmet Jail served mostly as a prison reserved for writers, journalists, artists as intellectual dissidents sentenced.

Billy Hayes (1947–) writer, actor and film director. Billy Hayes spent one night in Sultanahmet Jail after being arrested in 1970 and he was sent to Sağmalcılar prison afterwards.
Mihri Belli (1916–2011) communist leader
Deniz Gezmiş (1947–1972) militant
Nazım Hikmet (1901–1963) poet, in 1938/1939 and later in 1950 again
Rıfat Ilgaz (1911–1993) lecturer and writer
Orhan Kemal (1914–1970) novelist
Hikmet Kıvılcımlı (1902–1971) communist leader
Aziz Nesin (1915–1995) humorist
Kemal Tahir (1910–1973) novelist
Vedat Türkali (1919–2016) screenwriter

Conversion into hotel 
In 1992, after a long period of neglect, a redevelopment project was considered to convert the building into a hotel. The jailhouse, having great significance in terms of history of art and architecture, was to undergo a meticulous renovation and open as a deluxe hotel under Regent Hotels & Resorts as The Regent Istanbul. Following the acquisition of Regent by Four Seasons Hotels & Resorts in 1992, the project was rebranded and opened in 1996 as Four Seasons Hotel Istanbul at Sultanahmet.

The property closed in 2020 to undergo a comprehensive renovation, and reopened on December 1, 2021.

In literature 
The jailhouse was mentioned in Graham Greene's 1932 thriller novel Stamboul Train.

The site is featured in the poem "For Nazim Hikmet in the Old Prison, Now a Four Seasons Hotel" by the American poet Myra Shapiro.

See also
 Hotels in Istanbul

References

External links 
Four Seasons Hotel Istanbul at Sultanahmet official site

Government buildings completed in 1919
Ottoman architecture in Istanbul
Neoclassical architecture in Turkey
Defunct prisons in Turkey
Four Seasons hotels and resorts
Buildings and structures of the Ottoman Empire
Redevelopment projects in Istanbul
Fatih